Cornuscoparia annulicornis is a species of beetle in the family Cerambycidae. It was described by Heller in 1897, originally under the genus Jonthophana. It is known from Papua New Guinea.

Varietas
 Cornuscoparia annulicornis var. hirticornis (Heller, 1910)
 Cornuscoparia annulicornis var. wollastoni Gahan, 1915

References

Lamiini
Beetles described in 1897